Shirvani (also Romanized as Shīrvānī; also known as Shīrūnī) is a village in Hamaijan Rural District, Hamaijan District, Sepidan County, Fars Province, Iran. At the 2006 census, its population was 46, in 12 families.

References 

Populated places in Sepidan County